The Son of Sandokan (Italian: Il figlio di Sandokan) is a 1998 Italian adventure television miniseries. It is a sequel to the 1996 series The Return of Sandokan, which itself followed on from the original 1976 series Sandokan. All were based on the series of Sandokan novels by Emilio Salgari about a Malaysian pirate fighting against the British in the nineteenth century.

Kabir Bedi reprised his role of Sandokan from the earlier series with Marco Bonini playing his son. The cast also included Padma Lakshmi, Marián Aguilera, François Guétary, Joss Ackland, Daniel Olbrychski, Alberto Dell'Acqua and Barbara Livi. It was directed by Sergio Sollima. It was shot in Sri Lanka.

References

Bibliography
 Thomas Riggs. Contemporary Theatre, Film and Television. Cengage Gale, 2007.

External links
 

1998 Italian television series debuts
1990s Italian drama television series
Italian-language television shows
Italian television miniseries
Television shows based on works by Emilio Salgari
Television series set in the 19th century
Television shows set in Malaysia